Naked Run is a  long 1st order tributary to Stewarts Creek in Surry County, North Carolina.

Course 
Naked Run rises about 0.5 miles east of Lambsburg, Virginia in Carroll County and then flows southeast into North Carolina to join Stewarts Creek about 1.5 miles east of Crooked Oak, North Carolina.

Watershed 
Naked Run drains  of area, receives about 48.6 in/year of precipitation, has a wetness index of 331.47, and is about 65% forested.

See also 
 List of Rivers of North Carolina
 List of Rivers of Virginia

References 

Rivers of Surry County, North Carolina
Rivers of Carroll County, Virginia
Rivers of North Carolina
Rivers of Virginia